Mitromorpha striolata is a species of sea snail, a marine gastropod mollusk in the family Mitromorphidae.

Description

Distribution
This marine species occurs off Port Alfred, South Africa.

References

 Turton W.H. (1932). Marine Shells of Port Alfred, S. Africa. Humphrey Milford, London, xvi + 331 pp., 70 pls. 

striolata
Gastropods described in 1932